is a junction passenger railway station located in the town of Misaki, Osaka Prefecture, Japan, operated by the private railway operator Nankai Electric Railway. The station is the nearest station to Misaki Park, which is run by Nankai Group. It has the station number "NK41"

Lines

Layout
The station has two island platforms serving five tracks on an embankment. Track 4 is located in the south part of the northbound platform serving tracks 3 and 5.

Tracks

Adjacent stations

History
It was renamed to its present name on 1 January 1957.

Passenger statistics
In fiscal 2019, the station was used by an average of 4685 passengers daily.

Surrounding area
Misaki Park
Osaka Golf Club
Misaki Post Office
Sairyo Tomb
Shiratoyama Tomb
Mnanabeyama Tomb

See also
 List of railway stations in Japan

References

External links

  

Railway stations in Japan opened in 1938
Railway stations in Osaka Prefecture
Misaki, Osaka